Van Herp is a surname. Notable people with the surname include:

 Jacques Van Herp (1923–2004), Belgian writer and publisher of science fiction 
 Willem van Herp (1614–1677), Dutch Baroque painter
 Yvo Van Herp (born 1949), Belgian footballer

See also
 Herp (disambiguation)